is a Japanese sopranist.

Career

Tomotaka Okamoto was born December 3, 1976 in Sukumo, Japan, and graduated from the Kunitachi College of Music. He also graduated from the Conservatoire Francis Poulenc with a first place award. His debut album Sopranista charted for 17 weeks on the Oricon Albums Chart, peaking at number 100. He makes frequent guest appearances on national television.

In 2015, Okamoto was invited to the annual touring ice show Fantasy on Ice in Kanazawa and Shizuoka. He performed live in collaboration with different figure skaters to the aria "Nessun dorma", the hymn "Amazing Grace" and "Time to say goodbye" in a duet with singer Sarah Àlainn amongst others. At the closing ceremony of the 2020 Summer Olympics, Okamoto gave a committed and dramatic solo rendition of the Olympic hymn.

Style
He is a “sopranista”, a male who has a female soprano vocal range voice. He often dresses in a unique manner when he performs. His repertory is various; he sings castrato (Farinelli) compositions not only in opera, but also Japanese classics, crossover favorites, and pop ballads. He has also given solo concerts with piano accompaniment in various parts of Japan.

References

External links 
 Official website
 Sample songs in RealMedia/WMP

1976 births
Living people
Sopranists
Musicians from Kōchi Prefecture
Fantasy on Ice guest artists
21st-century Japanese singers
21st-century Japanese male singers